Bagh-e Malek (also Romanized as Bāgh-e Malek, Bāghmalek, and Bāgh Malek) is a village in Nurabad Rural District, Garkan-e Jonubi District, Mobarakeh County, Isfahan Province, Iran. At the 2006 census, its population was 1,645, in 435 families.

References 

Populated places in Mobarakeh County